George Wheeler (1858 – 9 December 1947) was an English entomologist who specialised in Lepidoptera.
The Reverend George Wheeler M.A. wrote Butterflies of Switzerland (1935), and completed Volume 11 of British Lepidoptera by James William Tutt, after the Tutt's death in 1911. He was an avid collector, especially of "varieties" of Lepidoptera. 
George Wheeler was a Fellow of the Entomological Society of London, sometime elected Secretary and Vice-President. In 1933 he was honoured as a Special Life Fellow. He was also a Fellow of the Zoological Society of London.

References
Salmon, M. A. 2000 The Aurelian Legacy. British Butterflies and their Collectors. Martins, Great Horkesley, Harley Books.

English lepidopterists
1858 births
1947 deaths
Fellows of the Royal Entomological Society
Fellows of the Zoological Society of London